Utile may refer to:

 , French Royal Navy gabarre, later HMS Utile after British capture
 , a French 56-gun  
 , any one of several British ships

Ship names